Yotfa or Kaeofa was the 14th Ayutthayan king from the Suphannaphum Dynasty (c. 1536 – 10 June 1548)

Yotfa was a son of King Chairachathirat and his consort Lady Si Suda Chan. He reigned from 1546 until his murder in 1548.

Birth 

Yotfa was born around 1536. He was the son of King Chairachathirat and Lady Si Suda Chan, the Consort of the Left. He had one brother, Prince Sisin, who was six years younger than him.

Reign 

After King Chairachathirat's death in 1546, Prince Yotfa succeeded to the throne at the age of eleven. His mother, Lady Si Suda Chan, then served as the regent. To avoid political conflicts with Lady Si Suda Chan, Prince Thianracha, the most senior member of the royal household, became a monk and stayed at Ratchapraditsathan Temple throughout the reign of Yotfa.

Jeremias van Vliet recorded that Yotfa was fond of riding a horse along the fields, watching elephant duels, learning to use weapons and studying political science, and that his reign saw abundance of agricultural products. However, many Thai chronicles recorded that bad omens occurred shortly after he ascended the throne. When Yotfa presided over an elephant duel, the tusk of Lord of Fire, a royal elephant, broke into three pieces. At night, another royal elephant, Lord of Six Tusks (named after a legendary six-tusked elephant), cried like a human being and strange sounds emerged from the Gate of Phaichayon, the gate to the Throne Hall of Phaichayon.

During this period, Lady Si Suda Chan committed adultery with a government officer known by his noble title Phan But Si Thep. Phan But Si Thep, whose personal name is unknown, was the Keeper of the Outer Chapel. Lady Si Suda Chan later ordered Lord Ratchaphakdi, Minister of Palace Affairs, to promote Phan But Si Thep to Khun Chinnarat, Keeper of the Inner Chapel. Heavily pregnant, Lady Sisudachan found it necessary to enthrone her paramour. In order to place the government officers in awe of Khun Chinnarat, she promoted him to Khun Worawongsathirat, authorised him to take charge of conscription affairs, ordered the construction of his residence next to the Conscription Pavilion near the palace walls, ordered the construction of his office under a white mulberry tree inside the palace, and ordered a royal taboret to be installed in his office for him to sit on. Lord Mahasena, Minister of Defence, complained about the political situation to his fellow ministers. Lady Si Suda Chan then had the minister killed.

Death 

Siamese chronicles recorded that in 1548, Lady Si Suda Chan eventually summoned all government officers and told the meeting that Yotfa was too young to rule the kingdom and that "I will place Khun Worawongsathirat in charge of public administration until my son is mature enough". As no one objected, Lady Si Suda Chan ordered the Ministry of Palace Affairs to hold a royal chariot procession to bring Khun Worawongsathirat into the palace and hold his coronation.

After becoming king, Khun Worawongsathirat ordered Yotfa to be murdered at Khok Phraya Temple but spared his brother, Prince Sisin. The Astrological Annals recorded that the execution was held on Sunday, the fifth day of the waxing moon in the eighth month of the 910th year of the Minor Era, corresponding to 10 June 1548. Yotfa had been on the throne for about two years and was around thirteen years of age when he was executed.

Lady Si Suda Chan, as well as her paramour and newborn daughter, were later killed in a countercoup staged by senior government officers, led by Khun Phirenthrathep (ขุนพิเรนทรเทพ). The coup makers then offered the throne to Prince Thianracha.

Ancestry

Notes 

1536 births
1548 deaths
Suphannaphum dynasty
16th-century murdered monarchs
Assassinated Thai people
Deaths by poisoning
Kings of Ayutthaya
16th-century monarchs in Asia
Princes of Ayutthaya
16th-century Thai people
Executed Thai monarchs
Executed children
Murder in 1548